is a Fukui Railway Fukubu Line railway station located in the city of Sabae, Fukui Prefecture, Japan.

Lines

Station layout
The station consists of one ground-level side platform serving a single bi-directional track. The station is unattended.

Adjacent stations

History
The station opened on October 1, 1935. A new station building was completed in September 1990.

Passenger statistics
In fiscal 2015, the station was used by an average of 72 passengers daily (boarding passengers only).

Surrounding area
The station is surrounded by homes and small factories. Tobanaka Elementary School is also nearby.

See also
 List of railway stations in Japan

References

External links

  

Railway stations in Fukui Prefecture
Railway stations in Japan opened in 1935
Fukui Railway Fukubu Line
Sabae, Fukui